Natasha Nic Gairbheith (born 1981) was crowned Miss Ireland on 5 July 2004, becoming the first ever fluent Irish-speaker to win the competition.  She competed at Miss World 2004 where she did not place.  She is originally from Gweedore, County Donegal, Ireland. Before winning Miss Ireland, Natasha had completed a degree in Law and Politics at National University of Ireland, Galway. She also acted in amateur productions at An Grianán Theatre in Letterkenny.

Since her success in the contest she worked as a model and appeared on Charity You're a Star, she was second to be knocked out.

In 2006 she gave birth to a baby boy, Pádraig, named after the father Patrick J McDermott, a  property developer, whom she was meant to marry in Derrybeg on 28 April 2007, but it was put back due to the death of the groom's niece and two children. They eventually married on 7 September 2007. The couple reside in Burt, County Donegal.

References

1981 births
Living people
Irish female models
Miss World 2004 delegates
Miss Ireland winners
People from Gweedore
You're a Star contestants
Beauty pageant contestants from Ireland